Anunwa "Nuni" Omot (born October 3, 1994) is a South Sudanese professional basketball player for the Lakeland Magic of the NBA G League. He played college basketball for the Baylor Bears after two years at Concordia University and Indian Hills Community College.

Early life and high school
Omot was born in a refugee camp in Nairobi, Kenya to Pillow and Kwot Omot. His parents and brother Aba lived in the camp for three years, following a dangerous 440-mile journey from Gambela, Ethiopia to the Kenyan border in escape from an ongoing civil war. They were arrested, spending one week in prison, before being freed with help from the United Nations and settling in the camp, which was crowded and did not provide adequate food. In 1996, Omot's mother and siblings moved to Minnesota with the help of Lutheran Immigration and Refugee Service. However, his father was barred from the United States due to medical reasons.

Living in Minnesota, Omot was looked after by his brother Aba, while his mother worked two jobs at Menards and Burlington Coat Factory to support the family. Omot first began playing football as a wide receiver, but he started playing basketball after a growth spurt. He also played soccer but basketball soon became his primary focus.

As a junior in high school, Omot joined the junior varsity basketball team at Mahtomedi High School in Mahtomedi, Minnesota. He moved up to varsity in his senior season, averaging 18 points, 6 rebounds, and 2 assists. Omot earned All-Conference and honorable mention All-State accolades in his final year at Mahtomedi. Still, he failed to earn any NCAA Division I scholarship offers in high school.

College career
Omot began his college career at Concordia in NCAA Division II and redshirted his freshman season, growing almost three inches. In 2014–15, he averaged 12.4 points and 5.5 rebounds per game, shooting 58 percent from the floor and 42 percent from behind the arc. In order to get more Division I exposure, Omot transferred to Indian Hills Community College. He averaged 12.2 points and 5.4 rebounds per game and started 33 games in one of the top junior college programs. He was named to the first-team all-conference and NJCAA Honorable mention All-American. Omot accepted a scholarship to Baylor on November 12, 2015.

Omot was forced to miss the fall semester of 2016 due to of academic reasons and played limited minutes the rest of the year. His best performance was scoring 14 points in a 74–64 win over Texas on January 18, 2017. He averaged 4.0 points and 1.9 rebounds per game. Omot put in a lot of work in the summer of 2017 to improve his game. Omot began his senior season with 15 points against Central Arkansas and had 12 points the following game against Texas A&M–Corpus Christi. He registered a career-high 30 points in a 105–82 win over Randall on December 9, 2017. However, Omot struggled to start Big 12 play and was replaced in the starting lineup by Mark Vital. In a loss to Oklahoma on January 31, 2018, Omot scored 23 points and hit all six three-point attempts. On February 20, in a game against West Virginia, Omot met his father for the first time in 21 years. As a senior, Omot averaged 9.9 points, 3.6 rebounds and 1.7 assists per game. He shot 48.9 percent from the field and 43.3 percent on three-pointers, which was fifth in the Big 12 Conference.

Professional career
After going undrafted in the 2018 NBA draft, Omot joined the Golden State Warriors for 2018 NBA Summer League. On September 25, 2018, he signed with the Brooklyn Nets on a training camp deal. Omot was waived by the Nets on October 11. He was subsequently added to the roster of the Nets’ NBA G League affiliate, the Long Island Nets.

On July 26, 2019, he signed with Macedonian club MZT Skopje.

On November 22, 2019, Omot was announced by ZZ Leiden of the Dutch Basketball League (DBL). His contract with Leiden began December 1. The 2019–20 season was cancelled prematurely in March because of the COVID-19 pandemic.

On June 12, 2020, Omot signed with Tofaş of the Basketbol Süper Ligi (BSL). On December 9, 2020, he was loaned to Trefl Sopot of PLK. Omot averaged 17.2 points and 4.9 rebounds per game.

On July 20, 2021, he signed with the Gießen 46ers of the Basketball Bundesliga.

In 2022, Omot played in the Baloncesto Superior Nacional, Puerto Rico’s professional league, with Leones de Ponce.

Westchester Knicks (2022–2023)
In September 2022, the New York Knicks added Omot to their training camp roster.
On September 23, 2022, Omot signed a contract with the New York Knicks. He was then later waived. On October 24, 2022, Omot joined the Westchester Knicks training camp roster.

Lakeland Magic (2023–present)
On March 2, 2023, Omot was traded to the Lakeland Magic.

National team career
In February 2022, Omot was selected by the South Sudan national basketball team to play in the qualifiers for the 2023 FIBA Basketball World Cup.

References

External links
Baylor Bears bio

1994 births
Living people
B.S. Leiden players
Basketball people from Nairobi
Basketball players from Saint Paul, Minnesota
Baylor Bears men's basketball players
Concordia University (Saint Paul, Minnesota) alumni
Dutch Basketball League players
Giessen 46ers players
Indian Hills Warriors basketball players
Kenyan expatriate basketball people in the United States
Kenyan men's basketball players
Long Island Nets players
Small forwards
Tofaş S.K. players
Westchester Knicks players
ZZ Leiden players